The James H. and Frances E. Laughlin House, in Sonoma County, California, near Windsor, was built around 1876.  It has also been known as Shady Farm.  The listing includes four contributing buildings and a contributing structure.  It was listed on the National Register of Historic Places in 1979.

It was designed and built by builder J.T. Ludwig, who had his own lumberyard and manufactured his own bricks.

It includes Greek Revival and Italianate elements.

See also
Windsor historical landmarks

References

External links

Houses completed in 1876
Greek Revival architecture in California

National Register of Historic Places in Sonoma County, California
Italianate architecture in California